Leutnant Werner Voss (13 April 1897 – 23 September 1917) was a friendly rival of World War I's leading ace, Manfred von Richthofen. Richthofen himself considered Voss as the only pilot with the potential to exceed Richthofen's aerial victory score. When Voss was killed in action, he had scored 48 victories.

Werner Voss's victories

Confirmed victories are numbered and listed chronologically. Unconfirmed victories are denoted by "u/c".

When two casualties are listed in Notes column, the first listed is the pilot, the other the aerial observer/gunner. Conflicting claims denoted by *, although only one counts as a confirmed victory according to either source.

Doubled horizontal lines mark changes in squadron assignments.

Endnotes

References
 Crean, Thomas. Lieutenant Der Reserve Werner Voss and the Pilots of Jasta 10. Outskirts Press, Incorporated, 2010. , 9781432748739.
 Diggens, Barry. September Evening: The Life and Final Combat of the German World War One Ace Werner Voss. Grub Street, 2003. , 9781904010470

Aerial victories of Voss, Werner
Voss, Werner